Castrolibero is a town and comune in the province of Cosenza in the Calabria region of southern Italy.

Twin towns
 Siemiatycze, Poland
 Għarb, Malta

References 

Cities and towns in Calabria